Quare is a subset of queer theory exploring the intersectionality of race and sexuality.

Quare could also mean:
 “The Quare Fellow”, a Brendan Behan play produced in 1954
 quare impedit English law writ commencing an advowson
 Daniel Quare (died 1724), an English clockmaker

Quare is also used in conversation in parts of Ireland, where it is used to mean something out of the ordinary (or "queer"). Often it is used to describe the weather (good or bad, or extreme).